Boadway Bros. or Boadway's was a chain of upscale department stores in Southern California and New Mexico during the 1910s and 1920s, which started with a single store in Pasadena carrying furniture.

First Pasadena store
In October 1912, the Boadway Brothers opened a new furniture store on Colorado Blvd. near Marengo. It consisted of three stories of 75 ft x 25 ft each,  total floor space, at a cost of $75,000.

Starting November 20, 1912 the space was used as a Christmas Shop, for which the stock was valued between $5000 and $6000, and the store was to have 130 saleswomen, 24 floorwalkers, 50 "cash girls" (cashiers) and 50 waitresses.

Second Pasadena store
On October 1, 1917 Boadway's opened a new Pasadena store and expanded to dry goods, apparel, thus becoming a mainline department store. It added dry goods, silks, velvets and other "highly specialized lines of merchandise" until acquiring a stock worth $250,000, including selected lines of furniture. A broad, grand staircase to the mezzanine floor was added. The mezzanine was to had four “salons” for display and fitting, each of a different decorative theme. The second floor shoed furniture and the top floor, draperies and carpets. New display fixtures were of mahogany and high-quality plate glass. Stock included imported and domestic lingerie and imported Italian underwear. The store's crowning mark was having a corsetière on site, a woman specialized in fitting and manufacturing corsets to order, in addition to selling high-quality ready-made corsets.

Planned Hollywood & Vine store
Dr. Edward O. Palmer was to build a six-story,  store for Boadway's in Hollywood at Hollywood and Vine, and in 1922, stock was sold to finance its construction. After Boadway Bros. went out of business the next year, B. H. Dyas, a Downtown Los Angeles-based department store, opened in the building in 1927. The Broadway department store took over the building in 1931 and it continues to be known as the Broadway Hollywood Building.

Store list
Boadway Bros. stores were acquired and liquidated as follows:

References

Defunct department stores based in Greater Los Angeles
Demolished buildings and structures in California
Companies based in Pasadena, California